Amarnath Gami is an Indian politician who holds the position of the Chairman of the Question and Calling Attention Committee of Bihar Legislative Assembly and second time Member of Legislative Assembly representing the Hayaghat constituency of Darbhanga district, Bihar. He was RJD candidate from Darbhanga Town seat in the 2020 Assembly Elections.

He is a member of Bharatiya Janata Party (BJP).

References
http://myneta.info/bih2010/candidate.php?candidate_id=1459
http://www.empoweringindia.org/new/preview.aspx?candid=344740&cid=84
http://www.vidhansabha.bih.nic.in/committees.html

Living people
Bihar MLAs 2010–2015
Bihar MLAs 2015–2020
People from Darbhanga district
Janata Dal (United) politicians
1967 births
Bharatiya Janata Party politicians from Bihar
Rashtriya Janata Dal politicians